Ron Warner (born September 26, 1975) is a former American football defensive end and linebacker in the National Football League (NFL) for the New Orleans Saints, the Tampa Bay Buccaneers, and the Washington Redskins. He was also a member of both the Winnipeg Blue Bombers and Edmonton Eskimos of the Canadian Football League (CFL).  He played college football at the Independence Community College for two seasons with the Pirates. During Warner’s two seasons with the Pirates, he earned Second-team NJCAA All-America honors and was also a First-team All-Jayhawk Conference selection at defensive end. He finished his collegiate career at University of Kansas and was drafted in the seventh round of the 1998 NFL Draft.

References

1975 births
Living people
American football defensive ends
American football linebackers
Barcelona Dragons players
Edmonton Elks players
Kansas Jayhawks football players
New Orleans Saints players
People from Independence, Kansas
Tampa Bay Buccaneers players
Washington Redskins players
Winnipeg Blue Bombers players
Independence Pirates football players
Players of American football from Kansas